Castell Bryn Gwyn is a prehistoric site on the Isle of Anglesey, west of Brynsiencyn. It is a circular clay and gravel bank covered with grass, still some 1.5 metres (5') high and revetted externally by stone walls, which surround a level area some 54 metres (177') in diameter. Its name means "White Hill Castle".

The original use of this site is uncertain although it may have been a religious sanctuary. Later Neolithic pottery indicates use in this period, and it may have been a henge monument at this time. The earliest bank and ditch belong to the end of the neolithic period (2500-2000 BC). During the Iron Age, the present wall was built, and it was refortified in Roman times and later.

Parking is exiguous; the site is accessible from the A4080 by a footpath. Another path follows the low ridge, southwest over stiles to the Bryn Gwyn stones, or northeast, past the site of the former stone circle of Tre'r Dryw Bach, some ½ mile (800 metres) to Caer Lêb where it meets a minor road with limited parking space.

See also 
 List of hillforts in Wales

References 

Prehistoric sites in Anglesey
Bronze Age Wales
Cadw
Stone Age sites in Wales
Megalithic monuments in Wales
Llanidan
Scheduled monuments in Anglesey